Zmeitsa is a village in southwestern Bulgaria. It is located in the municipality of Dospat, Smolyan Province.

Geography 
The village of Zmeitsa is located in the Western Rhodope Mountains. It is the easternmost settlement in the Chech region.
The highest peak is Gioz Tepe - 1652 m.

Religion 

Christian and Muslim

Public institutions 

Local government office, library, kindergarten and school.

Sights 
 Roman-style bridge over the Sarnena reka river.

Notes 

Villages in Smolyan Province
Chech